The Marilyn Davies College of Business is the business school of the University of Houston–Downtown (UHD), with programs fully accredited by the AACSB International.  It is one of five academic units at UHD, and is housed in the  Shea Street Building.

Departments and programs
The Marilyn Davies College of Business offers an MBA designed for working professionals, enabling them to
continue their careers while earning an advanced business education. Additionally, graduate students may pursue a Masters of Security Management, and a number of certificates. At the undergraduate level it offers a BBA (Bachelor of Business Administration) degree in nine major areas of studies within four academic departments:

Accounting & International Business
Finance, & Management Information Systems
General Business, Marketing, & Supply Chain Management
Management & Insurance Risk Management

Centers and Institutes
The Marilyn Davies College of Business houses five centers and institutes: 
Center for Entrepreneurship
Institute for Financial Literacy
Institute for Business, Ethics, and Public Issues
Insurance and Risk Management Center
Supply Chain Research Center

References

External links

University of Houston–Downtown
Business schools in Texas